Seafarers' Identity Documents Convention (Revised), 2003 (C185) is  an International Labour Organization Convention.

It was established in 1958, with the preamble stating:
Having been convened at Geneva by the Governing Body of the International Labour Office, and having met in its Ninety-first Session on 3 June 2003, and Mindful of the continuing threat to the security of passengers and crews and the safety of ships, to the national interest of States and to individuals, and

Mindful also of the core mandate of the Organization, which is to promote decent conditions of work, and

Considering that, given the global nature of the shipping industry, seafarers need special protection, and

Recognizing the principles embodied in the Seafarers' Identity Documents Convention, 1958, concerning the facilitation of entry by seafarers into the territory of Members, for the purposes of shore leave, transit, transfer or repatriation, and..

Modifications 

This Convention revised Convention C108 Seafarers' Identity Documents Convention, 1958

Ratifications

As of February 2023, the convention has been ratified by 38 states.

Differences between the C185 and C108 Seafarers' Identity Document Conventions 
The main difference between C185 and C108 is the use of biometric data as a reliable means of identification.
The successful application of the C185 required two main requirements:

1. the application of the necessary biometric technology;
2. the establishment of an appropriate infrastructure to control, manufacture and secure the production process of identifiers.

The requirements set out in the Convention have proved to be feasible.

E-passports and e-official travel documents have been used internationally since their introduction in 2006.
By 2018, more than 100 countries have already issued e-documents, which predicts the likelihood that these countries will ratify C185.

External links 
Text.
Ratifications.

References 

International Labour Organization conventions
Treaties concluded in 2003
Treaties entered into force in 2005
Treaties of Albania
Treaties of Azerbaijan
Treaties of the Bahamas
Treaties of Bangladesh
Treaties of Bosnia and Herzegovina
Treaties of Brazil
Treaties of the Republic of the Congo
Treaties of Croatia
Treaties of France
Treaties of Georgia (country)
Treaties of Hungary
Treaties of India
Treaties of Indonesia
Treaties of Jordan
Treaties of Kiribati
Treaties of Kazakhstan
Treaties of Lithuania
Treaties of Luxembourg
Treaties of Madagascar
Treaties of the Maldives
Treaties of the Marshall Islands
Treaties of Moldova
Treaties of Nigeria
Treaties of Pakistan
Treaties of the Philippines
Treaties of Russia
Treaties of South Korea
Treaties of Sri Lanka
Treaties of Spain
Treaties of Tunisia
Treaties of Turkmenistan
Treaties of Vanuatu
Treaties of Yemen
Identity documents
Admiralty law treaties
2003 in labor relations